Sachin: A Billion Dreams is a 2017 Indian documentary sports film directed by James Erskine and produced by Ravi Bhagchandka and Shrikant Bhasi under the banners 200 NotOut Productions and Carnival Motion Pictures. The film is a documentary on the life of Indian cricketer Sachin Tendulkar. It captures Tendulkar's cricket and personal life in substantial detail, as well as reveals a few aspects of his life which have never been heard of or seen before.

The film is simultaneously shot in Marathi, Hindi and English and was released on 26 May 2017, along with the dubbed versions in Tamil and Telugu. This film was declared tax free in Maharashtra, Chhattisgarh, Karnataka, Kerala, and Odisha. The film fared mediocre at the box office.

Plot
The film follow two main plots- The first shows Sachin's childhood to his career until 1999. The second focuses on his transformation as the 'God of Cricket' until his first world cup win. The film is mainly narrated by Sachin with some narration of Harsha Bhogle and Boria Majumdar. The film follows a scene-wise narration of different celebrities including fellow cricketers and actors. Most of the scenes in the film are depicted through video recordings of Sachin's personal life, interviews and cricket matches.

Before the film, clips are shown of birth of Sachin's daughter Sara. The film begins with Sachin tricking his friend to fall in a bore. Sachin narrates about his early childhood that he developed an interest in Cricket after India's 1983 triumph. He used to learn cricket from his coach R. Achrekar. Due to accommodations, he shifted to his aunt's house close to the park. Sachin rose to fame after he made a 664-run partnership with Vinod Kambli. He grew up practicing cricket daily until he was signed by Yorkshire.

There is a narration of Indo-Pak rivalry after which Sachin makes his international debut against Pakistan where he performed well. He was picked in the squad for the 1992 Cricket World Cup where India didn't have a great run. Later on, Sachin started rising up the charts.

The scene cuts back to Sachin and his wife Anjali walking in a park. Sachin tells about how he met her and later on they married. The film follows Sachin developing glory towards the start of 1996 World Cup. During its semifinal, India was eliminated despite Sachin's best performance.

Unfortunately Sachin's father died in 1999 before the start of 1999 World Cup. He played in depression though he performed well despite India not reaching the finals. He was praised for his courage and brilliance. Following that, the film shows in detail the darkest phase of Indian cricket. After that, BCCI devised a new team with new players. Tendulkar was made captain two times, having resigned both after facing pressure. He improved his performance by every match. After that, Sachin went on to become the poster boy of the country. He started featuring in most of the TV ads. Mark Mascarenhas also became Sachin's agent. Sachin transformed as the biggest celebrity in India at that time.

The film shows Sachin's rivalry with fellow cricketers transforming into friendship. It also throws light on India's famous test victory over Australia. Sachin went on to become Player Of The Series at the 2003 World Cup though India lost the final. The screen cuts back to Sachin with his son Arjun in England. Arjun was born 2 weeks after Sachin's father's death. Sachin practises with his son and aspires to make him a cricketer. He has always focused on his abilities due to which Arjun has entered the limelight. Every incident with Sachin results in India bestowing glory.

The film shows the events before the 2007 World Cup. The whole team seems to be dissuaded with coach Greg Chappell's advise. Their faith was crushed due to his discrimination policies. As a result, India was eliminated early in the journey by Sri Lanka. The team removed the coach and appointed Gary Kirsten as their coach.

A depressed Sachin is encouraged by his brother Ajit, to win the World Cup once and for all. Seeming maybe his last chance, he began to prepare everything before the 2011 Cricket World Cup being held in his country and the final in his own city. He eventually became the all-time Test run scorer. The film cuts back to his present life. Sachin tells that whenever he is upset, he always hangs out with his childhood friends. Clips are shown of their enjoyment. He deems them an important part of his life.

India eventually reaches the final of the world cup after 2 brilliant centuries from Sachin in group stages. Sachin gets out on a brittle 18 seeming his last World Cup innings. But strong partnerships and decisive innings by Gautam Gambhir and MS Dhoni get India back in the match. Dhoni seals the world cup with a six as Sachin finally achieves his lifelong dream. The nation goes berserk and everyone dedicates the victory to Sachin's 24-year hard work for his country. Later on, Sachin scores his 100th century against Bangladesh, an impossible milestone.

Sachin eventually plays his last Test match in 2013 wherein after scoring 74, he gives an emotional speech and thanks everyone who helped him by his way towards glory. He cries and bids farewell to the pitch. After achieving everything he wanted in his life, a proud Sachin walks by the beach thanking God.

In a video after the credits, though equally loving each member of his family, Sachin's father expresses that Sachin is and will be special for him forever.

Release
The film was released on 26 May 2017 in India. On 21 May, Sachin Tendulkar conducted a special screening of the film for the Indian Armed Forces personnel at the Indian Air Force Auditorium.

The film was released in five languages: English, Hindi, Marathi, Tamil and Telugu. Filmmakers cited the desire to appeal to fans across India.

Marketing
The name of the film was selected via a contest that Sachin Tendulkar had announced on Twitter.

In May 2017, Sachin traveled to London to promote the film.

Reception 
Hindustan Times wrote in their review that the movie had "everything" to make its audience "nostalgic". The Times of India gave 3 stars out of five.

Music 
The music is composed by A. R. Rahman, with lyrics is written by Irshad Kamil, and the lyrics for Tamil, Telugu and Marathi were written by Madhan Karky, Vanamali and Subodh Khanolkar respectively. The complete album featuring three songs were released on 28 April 2017 in Hindi, Tamil, Telugu and Marathi.

Awards 
The film won the trophy for the Best Director of a Long Documentary, the Special Award for the Best Film in the Long Documentary section and an honorary diploma at the 11th Tehran International FICTS Festival 2018.

References

External links
 
 
 

Films about cricket in India
2010s Hindi-language films
Indian films based on actual events
Sports films based on actual events
Films scored by A. R. Rahman
Sachin Tendulkar
2017 films
Indian documentary films
Cultural depictions of Indian men
Cultural depictions of cricketers